Ornuška Vas is a small settlement in the Municipality of Mokronog-Trebelno in southeastern Slovenia. The area is part of the historical region of Lower Carniola. The municipality is now included in the Southeast Slovenia Statistical Region. It includes the hamlet of Udna Vas.

A small chapel-shrine in the southern part of the village was built in 1889.

References

External links
Ornuška Vas on Geopedia

Populated places in the Municipality of Mokronog-Trebelno